Jñānagarbha (Sanskrit: ज्ञानगर्भ, Tibetan: ཡེ་ཤེས་སྙིང་པོ་, Wyl. ye shes snying po) was an 8th-century Buddhist philosopher from Nalanda who wrote on Madhyamaka and Yogacara and is considered part of Bhāviveka's Svatantrika tradition. He was a student of Shrigupta and the teacher and ordaining master of Śāntarakṣita. 
Tibetan sources refer to him, Santaraksita and Kamalaśīla as rang rgyud shar gsum meaning the "three eastern  Svātantrikas" indicating their origins from Eastern India.

Philosophy and works
In his mostly Svatantrika interpretation of Madhyamaka philosophy, Jñānagarbha incorporated aspects of Yogācāra philosophy and Dharmakirti's epistemology and therefore can be seen as a harmonizer of the various Buddhist philosophical systems like his student Śāntarakṣita. 

He is mostly known for his work "Distinguishing the Two Truths" (Skt. Satyadvayavibhaṅga, Wyl. bden gnyis rnam ‘byed). This work mostly sought to critique the views of Dharmapala of Nalanda and
his followers. A meditation text named "The Path for the Practice of Yoga" (Yoga-bhavana-marga or -patha) is also attributed to him by Tibetan sources. He also may have written a commentary to the Sandhinirmocana Sutra, a major sutra of the Yogacara school. However, it is possible that the author of this text was actually a different writer also named Jñānagarbha.

Jñānagarbha's Satyadvayavibhaṅga analyzes the Madhyamaka Two truths doctrine of conventional truth and ultimate truth. He defends the role of conceptual thinking and reasoning against those who would eliminate all conceptual thinking and theorizing (i.e. Candrakīrti). However, like other Madhyamikas, the goal of his project is a form of awareness which is free from all concepts, though one which, according to Jñānagarbha, is reachable through conceptual thought. Jñānagarbha held that even though language and reasoning is based on a cause and effect ontology which is ultimately empty and unreal, it can still lead towards the ultimate truth, through a logical analysis which realizes the untenable assumptions of reason and causality itself.

See also
Dharmakirti
Nagarjuna

Notes

References
Eckel, Malcom David; Jñanagarbha on The Two Truths, Motilal Banarsidass Publishers, 1992. 
Ruegg, David Seyfort ; History of Indian Literature Volume VII Fasc. 1, Literature of the Madhyamaka School of Philosophy, 1981. 
Hayes, Richard, "Madhyamaka", The Stanford Encyclopedia of Philosophy (Spring 2015 Edition), Edward N. Zalta (ed.), URL = <https://plato.stanford.edu/archives/spr2015/entries/madhyamaka/>.

External links

Indian scholars of Buddhism
8th-century Indian philosophers
Indian Buddhist monks
Monks of Nalanda
Madhyamaka scholars
Mahayana Buddhism writers
Buddhist spiritual teachers